Sven Olof Erik "Olle" Ferm (born 8 March 1947) is a retired Swedish swimmer who won a bronze medal in the 4 × 200 m freestyle relay at the 1966 European Aquatics Championships. He competed at the 1964 and 1968 Summer Olympics in the 4 × 200 m relay and three individual medley events with the best achievement of eighth place in the relay in 1968.

References

1947 births
Swedish male butterfly swimmers
Swedish male medley swimmers
Swimmers at the 1964 Summer Olympics
Swimmers at the 1968 Summer Olympics
Olympic swimmers of Sweden
Living people
European Aquatics Championships medalists in swimming
Sportspeople from Norrköping